The Myanmar Post is a weekly newspaper based in Pazundaung Township, Yangon, Burma.

It is published in Burmese and the 40-page newspaper is published on a Monday. The Myanmar Post was founded by Win Aung, a businessman, in 2008. The newspaper is privately owned by United Media Group Co. Ltd. (UMG), which is 100 percent locally owned.

The paper was one of several investigated by Myanmar's Police Intelligence Unit in 2014.

See also
List of newspapers in Burma
Media of Burma

References

External links 
 

Newspapers established in 2000
Mass media in Yangon